William Harrell (July 18, 1928 – May 6, 2014) was a reserve infielder in Major League Baseball who played between 1955 and 1961 for the Cleveland Indians (1955, 1957–1958) and Boston Red Sox (1961).

Harrell attended Siena College, and began his professional career with the Negro league Birmingham Black Barons in 1951. He was signed by Cleveland in 1952.
 
In a four-season career, Harrell was a .231 hitter (79-for-342) with eight home runs and 26 RBI in 173 games, including 54 runs, seven doubles, one triple, and 17 stolen bases. In 151 games as an infielder, he appeared at shortstop (77), third base (62), second (8) and first (3), and also played right field in one game, posting a collective fielding percentage of .952.

After finishing his professional playing career in the Red Sox farm system in 1966, Harrell briefly served as a Boston scout.

In 1966, Harrell became the third alumnus to be inducted into the Siena Athletics Hall of Fame.

In 2000, Harrell was named by Times Union as one of the top 10 athletes for the Capital Region for the 20th Century.

Basketball
Harrell played professional basketball for the Lenox Merchants in the 1950s. On January 13, 2006, Harrell became the first Siena Saints basketball player to have his jersey number (#10) retired by the school.

Death
Harrell died May 6, 2014 at his home in Albany, New York. He was 85.  he was buried at Oakwood Cemetery in Troy, New York.

References

External links
 or Retrosheet

1928 births
2014 deaths
African-American baseball players
Baseball players from Pennsylvania
Basketball players from Pennsylvania
Birmingham Black Barons players
Boston Red Sox players
Boston Red Sox scouts
Cedar Rapids Indians players
Cleveland Indians players
Indianapolis Indians players
Indianapolis Olympians draft picks
Major League Baseball infielders
Portland Beavers players
Reading Indians players
Rochester Red Wings players
San Diego Padres (minor league) players
Seattle Rainiers players
Siena Saints baseball players
Siena Saints men's basketball players
Toronto Maple Leafs (International League) players
American men's basketball players
Burials at Oakwood Cemetery (Troy, New York)
20th-century African-American sportspeople
21st-century African-American people
Sportspeople from Troy, New York